Bloomfield Science Museum is a science museum in Jerusalem, established in 1992.

The museum is located opposite the Hebrew University of Jerusalem, in the Givat Ram neighborhood. The museum is named for its principal donor, Neri Bloomfield. The museum features indoor and outdoor hands-on exhibits, among them a bubble-making corner in which huge bubbles are produced by chains and sticks. Special events at the museum include programs on science-related topics, such as  biomedical research, in which the public is invited to meet stem cell researchers and discuss the ethical issues involved. A special night science program sponsored by the European Union has been held at the museum for several years.

See also
Science and technology in Israel
Tourism in Israel
List of museums in Israel

References

External links
Bloomfield Science Museum website

Science museums in Israel
Museums in Jerusalem
Education in Israel
1992 establishments in Israel
Museums established in 1992